Rajitha is an Indian actress who works in Telugu films. She has been active since the late 1980s.

Career 
Rajitha made her debut in film industry at the age of 18 with the Telugu movie, Brahma Rudrulu in which she portrayed Akkineni Nageswara Rao's daughter. She played the role of a widow in Pelli Kanuka and won the Nandi Award for Best Female Comedian. The dialogue writer Posani Krishna Murali stated that her role involved no humor yet the awards committee decided to give Rajitha the award for best comedian.

Filmography 

 1986 Brahma Rudrulu
1987 Agni Putrudu
1988 Vivaha Bhojanambu
1990 Chinnari Muddula Papa
1990 Mouna Daaham  Malayalam film
1990 Prema Khaidi
1991 Amma Rajinama
 1991 Coolie No. 1
 1991 Prem Qaidi (Hindi)
 1991 Rowdy Gaari Pellam
 1992 Chinarayudu
1993 Mogudugaru
1994 Jailor Gaari Abbayi
1996 Pelli Sandadi
1996 Ladies Doctor
1996 Jabilamma Pelli
 1997 Super Heros
 1997 Subhakankshalu
1997 Preminchukundam Raa
1997 Abbai Gari Pelli
 1997  Collector Garu
1997 Priyaragalu
 1997 Pelli Chesukundam 
1998 Suryavamsam
1998 Sivayya
1998 Pandaga
1998 Pelli Peetalu
1998 Ooyala
1998 Srimathi Vellostha
1998 Premante Idera
1998 Rana
1998 Pelli Kanuka
1998 Allari Pellam
 1998 Suprabhatam
1999 Swayamvaram
1999 Alludugaaru Vachcharu
1999 Pilla Nachindi
1999 Ravoyi Chandamama
 2000  Postman
2000 Manasunna Maaraju
2000 Chiru Navvutho
2000 Uncle
2000 Sardukupodaam Randi
2001 Narasimha Naidu
2001 Preminchu
2001 Family Circus
2001 Bava Nachadu
2001 Akasa Veedhilo
2001 Manasantha Nuvve
2001 Navvuthu Bathakalira
2002 Allari Ramudu
2002 Seema Simham
2002 Naga Pratista
2002 Indra
2002 Moner Majhe Tumi (Bengali Film)
2002 Sontham
2002 Thotti Gang
 2003 Kabaddi Kabaddi
 2003 Dongodu
 2003 Villain
 2003 Jodi No.1
 2003 Abhimanyu
 2003 Neeke Manasichanu
 2003 Tiger Harischandra Prasad
 2004 Malliswari
 2004 Xtra
 2004 Valliddaru Okkate
 2004 143
 2004 Bhadradri Ramudu
 2004 Soggadi Saradalu
 2004 Vidyardhi
 2005 Are
 2005 Relax
 2005 Prayatnam
 2005 Sada Mee Sevalo
 2005 Kanchanamala Cable TV
 2005 Adirindayya Chandram
 2005 Okkade
 2005 Adirindayya Chandram
 2005 Jai Chiranjeeva
 2006 Lakshmi
 2006 Boss
 2006 Pellaina Kothalo
 2007 Maharathi
 2007 Madhumasam
 2007 Classmates
 2007 Sri Mahalakshmi
 2007 Yamagola Malli Modalayindi
 2007 Seema Sastri
 2008 Vaana
 2008 Ontari
 2008 Pelli Kani Prasad
 2008 Nagaram
 2008 Bommana Brothers Chandana Sisters
 2008 Parugu
 2008 Kathanayakudu
 2008 Kuselan (Tamil)
 2008 Ready 
 2008 Chintakayala Ravi
 2008 Kotha Bangaru Lokam
 2008 1940 Lo Oka Gramam
 2008 Dongala Bandi 
 2008 King
 2009 Mitrudu
 2009 Sankham
 2009 Ganesh
 2010 Panchakshari
 2010 Happy Happy Ga
 2010 Baava
 2010 Bindaas
 2011 Bhale Mogudu Bhale Pellam
 2011 Aha Naa Pellanta!
 2011 Teen Maar
 2011 Mr Perfect
 2012 Rebel
 2012 Damarukam
 2012  Julai
 2013 Seethamma Vakitlo Sirimalle Chettu
 2013 Atharintiki Daaredi
 2013 Bhai
 2014 Yevadu
 2014 Aagadu
 2014 Pilla Nuvvu Leni Jeevitham
 2014 Lingaa (Tamil)
 2015 Bham Bolenath
 2015 S/O Satyamurthy
 2015 Lion
 2015 James Bond
 2015 Pandaga Chesko
 2015 Srimanthudu
 2015 Soukhyam
 2016 Sarrainodu
 2016 Supreme
 2016 Brahmotsavam
 2016 A Aa
 2016 Selfie Raja
 2016 Babu Bangaram
 2016 Janatha Garage
 2016 Intlo Deyyam Nakem Bhayam
 2017 Nenu Local
 2017 Maa Abbayi
 2017 Rarandoi Veduka Chudham
 2017 Duvvada Jagannadham
 2017 Mahanubhavudu
 2017 Raja The Great
 2017 Next Nuvve 
 2018 Bhaagamathie
 2018 Touch Chesi Chudu
 2018 Bharath Ane Nenu
 2018 Nela Ticket
 2018 Jamba Lakidi Pamba
 2018 Srinivasa Kalyanam
 2018 Sailaja Reddy Alludu
 2018 Savyasachi
 2019 Viswasam (Tamil)
2019 F2: Fun and Frustration
2019 Majili
2019 Tenali Ramakrishna BA. BL
2019 Prati Roju Pandage
2020 Sarileru Neekevvaru
2020 V
2021 Bangaru Bullodu
2021 FCUK: Father Chitti Umaa Kaarthik
2021 Gaali Sampath
2021 Chaavu Kaburu Challaga
2021 Varudu Kaavalenu
2021 Manchi Rojulochaie
2021 Annaatthe (Tamil)
2022 Aadavallu Meeku Johaarlu
2022 F3
2022 Swathi Muthyam
2022 Macherla Niyojakavargam
2022 Urvasivo Rakshasivo

References

External links
 

Telugu actresses
Actresses in Telugu cinema
Actresses in Malayalam cinema
Actresses in Tamil cinema
Indian film actresses
20th-century Indian actresses
21st-century Indian actresses
People from Kakinada
Actresses from Andhra Pradesh
Nandi Award winners
Actresses in Hindi cinema
Actresses in Bengali cinema
Year of birth missing (living people)